Manuel Villegas may refer to:

Manuel Delgado Villegas (1943–1998), Spanish serial killer
Manuel Villegas (golfer) (born 1984), Colombian golfer
Manuel Villegas (swimmer) (1908–?), Mexican swimmer
Manuel Villegas Piñateli (died 1752), member of the Royal Spanish Academy